Money for Nothing is a greatest hits album by British rock band Dire Straits released on 17 October 1988, featuring highlights from the band's first five albums. The vinyl edition omits the song "Telegraph Road" and has a different running order.

Details 
The first track on the album, "Sultans of Swing", which was the group's first hit single, was re-released as a single in the UK in November 1988 to promote the album.

The album was remastered and reissued with the rest of the Dire Straits catalogue in 1996 for most of the world outside the United States, before being deleted in 1998 and replaced by another compilation, Sultans of Swing: The Very Best of Dire Straits.

The cover art is a screenshot taken from the "Money for Nothing" music video.

A newly-remastered version of the compilation was issued in the UK to streaming platforms and on vinyl on 17 June 2022. This reissued vinyl includes the live version of "Telegraph Road" omitted from the original vinyl release. The version issued to streaming services originally included an alternate version of "Sultans of Swing" used for release as a single in 1978, before being replaced with the album version.

Track listing 
All songs written by Mark Knopfler, except where noted.

Original 1988 vinyl release

Remastered 2022 release
 Released on June 17, 2022
 Available on vinyl and digital download only
 The tracks, versions and song order are the same as the original 1988 CD International and American releases
 Released as a double LP

Charts

Weekly charts

Year-end charts

Certifications and sales

References 

Dire Straits albums
1988 greatest hits albums
Albums produced by Mark Knopfler
Vertigo Records compilation albums
Compilation albums by British artists
Rock compilation albums
Warner Records compilation albums